Rancho San Gorgonio, or San Gorgonio Rancho, might refer to;

Places
Rancho San Gorgonio, a cattle ranch established in the San Gorgonio pass in 1824 by the San Gabriel Mission near Los Angeles
Rancho San Gorgonio, a master planned community under development in Banning, California 
Rancho San Jacinto y San Gorgonio, an 1843 Mexican Land Grant in Southern California

See also
San Gorgonio (disambiguation)

San Gorgonio Pass